Fabien Bachir Camus (born 28 February 1985) is a Tunisian footballer who plays as an attacking midfielder.

Club career
Camus joined Montpellier HSC at the age of 15. Two years later, he was remarked by a scout and taken to sign a contract with another French team Olympique de Marseille. Until he was 18, he played in the reserves, but after a while, he was promoted to the main team and he played several Ligue 1 matches.

He scored his first goal in the Belgian Jupiler League on 30 September 2005 against Club Brugge.

He had a great 2006–07 season, which raised the attention of major European clubs like Bayer Leverkusen, PSG, AS Monaco or Spartak Moscow and Panathinaikos.

In the summer of 2009, Camus signed a four-year deal with K.R.C. Genk. He joined French Ligue 1 side Évian in July 2014, signing a one-year loan deal.

In the summer of 2016, Camus signed a four-year deal with Royal Antwerp F.C.

In January 2018, Camus signed till the end of the season with YR KV Mechelen.

In December 2018, he signed with UMS Montélimar. He left the club again at the end of the season.

International career
Camus was called to the Tunisia national football team in February 2009.

Fraud
In October 2018, midfielder Camus was charged and detained as part of an anti-corruption investigation.

In November 2018, Camus, who had been locked up since October, was to be released from prison. The at that time club-less player was suspected of belonging to a criminal organization and of money laundering. He returned to the south of France.

Career statistics

International

Honours
Belgian Super Cup: 2011

References

External links
 

1985 births
Living people
Association football midfielders
Citizens of Tunisia through descent
Tunisian footballers
Tunisia international footballers
French footballers
French sportspeople of Tunisian descent
Tunisian people of French descent
Olympique de Marseille players
R. Charleroi S.C. players
K.R.C. Genk players
ES Troyes AC players
Thonon Evian Grand Genève F.C. players
Royal Antwerp F.C. players
K.V. Mechelen players
Ligue 1 players
Belgian Pro League players
Tunisian expatriate footballers
Expatriate footballers in Belgium